Daniel Duarte Romero (born May 24, 1985, in Mexico City) is a former professional Mexican footballer who last played for Potros UAEM.

External links

Living people
1985 births
Footballers from Mexico City
Mexican footballers
Club León footballers
Correcaminos UAT footballers
Club Celaya footballers
Potros UAEM footballers
Boyacá Chicó F.C. footballers
Mexican expatriate footballers
Expatriate footballers in Colombia
Mexican expatriate sportspeople in Colombia
Categoría Primera B players
Association footballers not categorized by position